Coel (Old Welsh: Coil), also called Coel Hen (Coel the Old) and King Cole, is a figure prominent in Welsh literature and legend since the Middle Ages. Early Welsh tradition knew of a Coel Hen, a  4th-century leader in Roman or Sub-Roman Britain and the progenitor of several kingly lines in Yr Hen Ogledd (the Old North), a region of the Brittonic-speaking area of what is now northern England and southern Scotland.

Later medieval legend told of a Coel, apparently derived from Coel Hen. He was said to be the father of Saint Helena and through her the grandfather of Roman Emperor Constantine the Great.

Other similarly named characters may be confused or conflated with the Welsh Coel. The legendary "King Coel" is sometimes supposed to be the historical basis for the popular nursery rhyme "Old King Cole", but this has been said to be unlikely.

Name
Coel's name was rendered "Coil" in Old Welsh. It may be the same as the common noun coel, meaning "belief, credence; confidence, reliance, trust, faith" (a secondary meaning is "omen"), derived from Proto-Celtic  "omen" and ultimately from Proto-Indo-European *keh2ilo- "whole, healthy; blessed with good omen". Coel is often named as "Coel Hen", Hen being an epithet meaning "old" (i.e., "Coel the Old"). The genealogies give him an additional epithet, Godebog (Old Welsh: Guotepauc), meaning "Protector" or "Shelterer". His name is thus sometimes given as "Coel Godebog" or "Coel Hen Godebog". However, some of the Harleian genealogies list Godebog as Coel's father's name. Geoffrey of Monmouth rendered the name as both Coel and Coillus in his Historia Regum Britanniae. Some modern authors modernize it to "Cole".

Context and evidence
Coel Hen appears in the Harleian genealogies and the later pedigrees known as the Bonedd Gwŷr y Gogledd (The Descent of the Men of the North) at the head of several post-Roman royal families of the Hen Ogledd. His line, collectively called the Coeling, included such noted figures as Urien, king of Rheged; Gwallog, perhaps king of Elmet; the brothers Gwrgi and Peredur; and Clydno Eiddin, king of Eidyn or Edinburgh. He was also considered to be the father-in-law of Cunedda, founder of Gwynedd in North Wales, by his daughter Gwawl. The poem Y Gododdin mentions some enmity between the "Sons of Godebog", possibly a reference to the Coiling, and the heroes who fought for the Gododdin at the Battle of Catraeth.

Judging by the genealogical references, Coel Hen must have controlled a large part of the Hen Ogledd. As an ancestor figure, he compares to Dyfnwal Hen, who is likewise attributed with founding kingly lines in the Hen Ogledd. Hector Boece and Ayrshire folklore both state that Coel and his entire army perished in the Battle of Coilsfield.  According to Welsh tradition the region of Kyle was named for Coel, and a mound at Coylton in Ayrshire was regarded as his tomb. Projections back from dated individuals suggest that Coel Hen lived around AD 350–420, during the time of the Roman departure from Britain. In his book The Age of Arthur, historian John Morris suggested Coel may have been the last of the Roman Duces Brittanniarum (Dukes of the Britons) who commanded the Roman army in northern Britain, and split his lands among his heirs after his death. However, Morris's book has been widely criticized. It has been suggested that Coel was appointed governor of northern Britain, ruling from Eburacum (York), by Magnus Maximus.

Colchester legend
By the 12th century, Coel had become attached to the "Colchester legend", which claimed he was a ruler of Colchester in Essex and the father of Saint Helena, and therefore the grandfather of Constantine the Great. The legend originated from a folk etymology indicating that Colchester was named for Coel (supposedly from "Coel" and "castrum", producing "fortress of Coel"). However, the city was actually known as Colneceaster until the n was dropped in around the 10th century; its name likely comes from the local River Colne.

Around the same time, a further development of this legend that King Coel of Colchester was the father of Empress Saint Helena, and therefore the grandfather of Constantine the Great, appeared in Henry of Huntingdon's Historia Anglorum and Geoffrey of Monmouth's Historia Regum Britanniae. The passages are clearly related, even using some of the same words, but it is not clear which version was first. Henry appears to have written the relevant part of the Historia Anglorum before he knew about Geoffrey's work, leading J. S. P. Tatlock and other scholars to conclude that Geoffrey borrowed the passage from Henry, rather than the other way around. The source of the claim is unknown, but may have predated both Henry and Geoffrey. Diana Greenway proposes it came from a lost hagiography of Helena; Antonia Harbus suggests it came instead from oral tradition.

Geoffrey's largely legendary Historia Regum Britanniae expands upon Henry's brief mention, listing Coel as a King of the Britons following the reign of King Asclepiodotus. In the Historia, Coel grows upset with Asclepiodotus's handling of the Diocletianic Persecution and begins a rebellion in his duchy of Caer Colun (Colchester). He meets Asclepiodotus in battle and kills him, thus taking the kingship of Britain upon himself. Rome, apparently, is pleased that Britain has a new king, and sends senator Constantius Chlorus to negotiate with him. Afraid of the Romans, Coel meets Constantius and agrees to pay tribute and submit to Roman laws as long as he is allowed to retain the kingship. Constantius agrees to these terms, but Coel dies one month later. Constantius marries Coel's daughter, Helena, and crowns himself as Coel's successor. Helena subsequently gives birth to a son who becomes the Emperor Constantine the Great, giving a British pedigree to the Roman imperial line.

Local tradition came to suggest that Coel was responsible for some of the ancient buildings in Colchester; a public conduit in the High Street was named "King Coel's Pump", the Balkerne Gate in the Roman town walls was known as "King Coel's Castle" and the remains of the Temple of Claudius over which Colchester Castle was built were called "King Coel's Palace".

Other stories 
There is an old story told in the North about Coel's last campaign. What is now Scotland was originally inhabited by both Brythonic and Pictish tribes. It was during Coel's time that the Scotti tribe began to settle the Western coast around Argyle. Coel, fearing that these Northern peoples would unite against his domain south of Hadrian's Wall, sent raiding parties across his northern border to stir up discord between them. The plan, however, backfired for the Picts and the Scots were not taken in. Coel merely succeeded in pushing the two even closer together, and they began to attack the Brittonic Kingdom of Strathclyde. Coel declared all out war and moved north to expel the invaders. The Picts and Scots fled to the hills ahead of Coel's army, who eventually set up camp at what became Coylton alongside the Water of Coyle (Ayrshire). For a long time, the British were triumphant, while the Scots and Picts starved. Desperate for some relief, however, the enemy advanced an all-or-nothing attack on Coel's stronghold. Coel and his men were taken by surprise, overrun and scattered to the winds. It is said that Coel wandered the unknown countryside until he eventually got caught in a bog at Coilsfield (in Tarbolton, Ayrshire) and drowned. Coel was first buried in a mound there before being removed to the church at Coylton. The year was about AD 420. After his death, tradition says that Coel's Northern kingdom was divided between two of his sons, Ceneu and Gorbanian.

Notes

Bibliography

British traditional history
Northern Brythonic monarchs
Cornish folklore
4th-century monarchs in Europe
Diocletianic Persecution